Xu Daoning (c. 970–1051/53) was a Chinese painter of the Northern Song Dynasty (960–1279) from Chang'an (now Xi'an) or Hejian (河间 now Hebei). He started out life by selling medicine prescriptions in Kaifeng. While selling prescriptions, he also began painting nature scenes in the style of Li Cheng. After gaining popularity he took up painting murals for Chinese nobles. His most notable work is Fishermen's Evening Song (ca. 1049).

See also
Culture of the Song Dynasty

Notes

References
 Ci hai bian ji wei yuan hui. Ci hai . Shanghai: Shanghai ci shu chu ban she , 1979.
 Barnhart, R. M. et al. (1997). Three thousand years of Chinese painting. New Haven, Yale University Press.

External links

Landscapes Clear and Radiant: The Art of Wang Hui (1632-1717), an exhibition catalog from The Metropolitan Museum of Art (fully available online as PDF), which contains material on Xu Daoning (see index)
 https://web.archive.org/web/20070928004147/http://www.nelson-atkins.org/art/CollectionDatabase.cfm?id=12243&theme=china
 http://www.artnet.com/library/09/0925/T092577.asp

Song dynasty painters
970s births
1050s deaths
Artists from Xi'an
Painters from Shaanxi